Antón Quindimil Rodríguez (born 23 November 1999) is a Spanish footballer who plays for SDC Polvorín as a central defender.

Club career
Born in Abegondo, A Coruña, Galicia, Quindimil joined RC Celta de Vigo's youth setup in 2015, from Racing de Ferrol. On 21 July 2018, after finishing his formation, he moved to Tercera División side UD Somozas.

Quindimil made his senior debut on 26 August 2018, starting and scoring the opener in a 4–0 home routing of former side Racing Ferrol. In July of the following year, after contributing with three goals in 35 matches, he moved to CD Lugo and was assigned to the farm team also in the fourth division.

Quindimil made his first team debut on 13 September 2020, coming on as a second-half substitute for Borja Domínguez in a 0–2 away loss against CF Fuenlabrada.

References

External links

2000 births
Living people
Sportspeople from the Province of A Coruña
People from A Coruña (comarca)
Spanish footballers
Footballers from Galicia (Spain)
Association football defenders
Segunda División players
Tercera División players
UD Somozas players
Polvorín FC players
CD Lugo players